Czech Film Critics' Award for Best Film is one of the awards given to the best Czech motion picture.

Winners

References

External links

Awards for best film
Czech Film Critics' Awards
Awards established in 2010